Xintiandi is an affluent car-free shopping, eating and entertainment district of Shanghai.

Xintiandi may also refer to:
Xintiandi Station, Shanghai
Xintiandi, Chinese name of Shincheonji, a Korean new religious movement
, multimedia and gaming company established in 1997
Xintiandi, EP by Beyond (band)